Shamsabad (also Romanized as Shamsābād) is a village in Pain Velayat Rural District, in the Central District of Taybad County, Razavi Khorasan Province, Iran. At the 2006 census, its population was 138, in 35 families.

References 

Populated places in Taybad County